The Sambalpur–Banaras Express is an Express train belonging to East Coast Railway zone that runs between  and  in India. It is currently being operated with 18311/18312 train numbers on twice in a week basis.

Service

The 18311/Sambalpur–Banaras Express has an average speed of 45 km/hr and covers 893 km in 19h 45m. 118312/Banaras–Sambalpur Express has an average speed of 44 km/hr and covers 893 km in 20h 15m.

Route and halts 

The important halts of the train are:

Coach composition

The train has standard LCF rakes with max speed of 110 kmph. The train consists of 18 coaches:

 1 AC II Tier
 3 AC III Tier
 6 Sleeper coaches
 6 General
 2 Generators cum Luggage/parcel van

Traction

Both trains are hauled  by a Tatanagar Loco Shed-based WAM-4 electric locomotive from Sambalpur to Banaras, and vice versa.

Rake sharing

Train shares its rake with 22803/22804 Howrah–Sambalpur Superfast Express

See also 

 Banaras railway station
 Sambalpur Junction railway station
 Bhubaneswar–Anand Vihar Weekly Superfast Express
 Howrah–Sambalpur Superfast Express
 Ranchi–Varanasi Express

Notes

External links 

 18311/Sambalpur - Varanasi Express
 18312/Varanasi - Sambalpur Express

References 

Passenger trains originating from Varanasi
Transport in Sambalpur
Express trains in India
Rail transport in Odisha
Rail transport in Jharkhand
Rail transport in Bihar